Dangerous Paradise may refer to:
 Dangerous Paradise (1930 film), an American Pre-Code drama film
 Dangerous Paradise (1931 film), a Swedish drama film
 The Dangerous Paradise, a 1920 American silent comedy film